The Science of Discworld III: Darwin's Watch (2005) is a book set on the Discworld, by Terry Pratchett, Ian Stewart and Jack Cohen. It is the sequel to The Science of Discworld and The Science of Discworld II: The Globe.

According to Stewart:

The title refers to William Paley's watchmaker analogy and  Richard Dawkins' subsequent description of evolution as the Blind Watchmaker.

Plot summary
In the Discworld story the wizards learn that, once again, the history of Roundworld has changed, resulting in humans failing to leave Earth before the extinction event shown in the earlier books. They discover that the difference from established history was that Charles Darwin wrote a book called Theology of Species, which described how evolution must be controlled by a Creator. This was generally accepted by both religious figures and conservative scientists, and led to a certain stagnation of thought, preventing the eventual invention of the space elevator. When the wizards try to correct this, the potential futures of Roundworld go mad. The possibility of Darwin ever writing the book becomes near zero, with most futures featuring his death or failure to write a book in seemingly improbable—and sometimes downright ridiculous—ways.

The wizards eventually deduce that Roundworld has caught the attention of the Auditors of Reality, who approve of a universe which runs on unthinking rules, and disapprove of humans, who try to make it more like the Discworld. Unlike the elven invasion in The Globe, which suppressed our creativity unthinkingly, this is a deliberate attempt to prevent humans escaping Earth.

While attempting to maintain a timeline where The Origin was written, the wizards inadvertently take Darwin to the Discworld. There they discover that his line of thought was disrupted by an Auditor-advised visit from the Disc's God of Evolution, leading to Theology. After defeating the Auditors the wizards manage to correct this, by explaining the situation to Darwin. Since Darwin then wishes to forget the whole thing, they are ethically able to grant his request after showing him the culmination of his legacy—the Natural History Museum in London.

Ideas and themes

In the discussion section Cohen and Stewart examine the theory of evolution and the changes in the idea over the years. They also explore how scientific theories happen in general, and how they differ from other ways of thinking, as well as a brief diversion into the concept of time travel. The Discworld story reflects all this, as the wizards must ensure that The Origin of Species is written to maintain Earth's history.

At the 2006 Discworld Convention, Cohen and Stewart explained that they originally drafted a very different outline for Science of Discworld III, in which the wizards visited various different fictional versions of Mars (Ray Bradbury's Mars, H.G. Wells' Mars, Edgar Rice Burroughs' Mars, etc.), culminating in the discovery of a Discworld version of Barsoom, (a square, red world, on the back of four , on the back of a giant ). This was abandoned when it was realised both that this discovery would have to have repercussions in later books, especially if, as planned, the "Martians" invaded; and also that Barsoom was close enough to sword and sorcery in any case that transplanting it to the Discworld setting did not alter it enough to be funny.

References

External links
 

Books by Ian Stewart (mathematician)
2005 books
Discworld books
Ebury Publishing books